This article lists the major power stations located in Liaoning Province.

Non-renewable

Coal-based

Nuclear

Renewable

Hydroelectric

Conventional

* The power station is shared by China and North Korea, and operated by North Korea.
** The power station is shared by China and North Korea, and operated by China.

Pumped-storage

Wind

References 

Power stations
Liaoning